Persatuan Sepak Bola Indonesia Pekalongan, commonly known as Persip Pekalongan, or Persip, is an  Indonesian football club based in Pekalongan, Central Java. They currently compete in Liga 3.

History 
Football as a people's sport has a long history in Pekalongan. This can be traced back to the colonial era around 1920 before PSSI was founded, football had become an activity that many people watched, at that time a European club from Austria had time to compete with a local team in the town square. Pekalongan and one of the oldest clubs in Pekalongan ever recorded is THH, a club owned by Chinese residents.
 
recorded in the book Voetbal 40 Jarr in the Netherlands indie, 1894-1934 by W. Berrety. THH is one of the clubs from Pekalongan that participates in a competition held by NIVU (Nederlandsche Indishe Voetbal Unie) or a football association organized by Dutch East Indies. It is not surprising that this historical site is now starting to be pioneered again by Laskar Kalong who are able to penetrate the Indonesian Premier Division level.
 
The local teams in Pekalongan, both those that have existed since the colonial era or those that emerged after the independence era, have a myriad of talented talents. One of Pekalongan's talents who was able to penetrate the list of players Indonesian national team was Muhammad Ridho. In addition, several national players have played for Persip Pekalongan, including: Patricio Jiménez Díaz, Zulvin Zamrun, Elie Aiboy, Awan Setho Raharjo, Irkham Mila, Wahyu Wiji Astanto, Ibrahim Sanjaya, and Arif Yanggi Rahman.

Stadium
Their homeground is Hoegeng Stadium, which is situated in Keraton Sports Complex in the downtown of Pekalongan, Central Java.

Honours
 Liga 3 Central Java
 Champions: 2022

References

External links
 Liga-Indonesia site
 

Pekalongan
Football clubs in Indonesia
Association football clubs established in 1934
Football clubs in Central Java